Marko Jordan (born 27 October 1990) is a Croatian football player, who currently plays for Zadar.

Club career
He made his professional debut in the Croatian First Football League for Šibenik on 8 May 2010 in a game against Dinamo Zagreb.

On 11 February 2018, Jordan signed for FC Alashkert. He then joined Episkopi in Greece which he played for until the summer 2019. On 2 November 2019, Jordan then joined AO Poros. He left the club again in mid-December 2019.

After a spell at NK Rogaška in Slovenia, Jordan moved to Swedish club FC Linköping City on 11 September 2020. He left the club at the end of the year.

References

External links
 

1990 births
Living people
Sportspeople from Zadar
Association football forwards
Croatian footballers
NK Zagora Unešić players
HNK Šibenik players
RNK Split players
NK Dugopolje players
NK Sesvete players
NK GOŠK Gabela players
FC Fastav Zlín players
NK Istra 1961 players
Latina Calcio 1932 players
FC Alashkert players
Episkopi F.C. players
NK Rogaška players
FC Linköping City players
NK Međimurje players
Serie B players
Czech First League players
Czech National Football League players
Croatian Football League players
First Football League (Croatia) players
Premier League of Bosnia and Herzegovina players
Armenian Premier League players
Slovenian Second League players
Ettan Fotboll players
Croatian expatriate footballers
Croatian expatriate sportspeople in Bosnia and Herzegovina
Croatian expatriate sportspeople in the Czech Republic
Croatian expatriate sportspeople in Italy
Croatian expatriate sportspeople in Armenia
Croatian expatriate sportspeople in Greece
Croatian expatriate sportspeople in Slovenia
Croatian expatriate sportspeople in Sweden
Expatriate footballers in Bosnia and Herzegovina
Expatriate footballers in the Czech Republic
Expatriate footballers in Italy
Expatriate footballers in Armenia
Expatriate footballers in Greece
Expatriate footballers in Slovenia
Expatriate footballers in Sweden